State Electricity Board may refer to:

India
 Assam State Electricity Board
 Bihar State Electricity Board
 Gujarat State Electricity Board
 Jharkhand State Electricity Board
 Himachal Pradesh State Electricity Board
 Kerala State Electricity Board
 Maharashtra State Electricity Board
 Rajasthan State Electricity Board
 West Bengal State Electricity Board
 Tamil Nadu Electricity Board

United Kingdom
For the former electricity boards of the UK see Electricity Act 1947